The Bondi United Rugby League Football Club was formed in 1946 and is an Australian rugby league football club based in Bondi, New South Wales. The club is affiliated with the Sydney Roosters Juniors but they play in the South Sydney District Junior Rugby Football League.

Notable players
Ferris Ashton
Paul Dunn
Luke Ricketson
Matthew Elliott
Luke Towers
Tom Symonds
Ian Rubin
John Peard
Johnny Mayes
Kevin Junee
Todd Ollivier
Paul Dunn (moved from Bathurst as a teen)
 Ray Beaven

See also

Sydney Roosters Juniors
List of rugby league clubs in Australia

References

External links
 

Rugby league teams in Sydney
Rugby clubs established in 1946
1946 establishments in Australia
Bondi, New South Wales
Waverley, New South Wales